Raw Leiba is an American actor, producer, stunt coordinator, former athlete and model.

Career 
Leiba played Stringer Bell's bodyguard in three episodes of The Wire: "Reformation", "Middle Ground" and "Mission Accomplished". He was named Gym Magazine'''s "Fittest Human" for 2007. In 2015, he appeared in a film called The Mint. Leiba appeared in the 2015 film Bone Tomahawk'', where he starred in a role as the main antagonist called "Wolf Skull", the savage and mute leader of an extremely violent cannibalistic mute clan, called the "Troglodytes".

Filmography

Film

Television

Video games

References

External links

Living people
Date of birth missing (living people)
Male actors from Newark, New Jersey
American people of Brazilian descent
American people who self-identify as being of Native American descent
African-American male actors
American male television actors
American male film actors
21st-century American male actors
Year of birth missing (living people)
21st-century African-American people
20th-century African-American people
Brazilian American
Brazilian actors
Brazilian athletes